The governorates of the Grand Principality of Finland were the administrative division of the Grand Principality of Finland as part of the Russian Empire from 1809 to 1917.

The administrative division of Finland followed the Russian imperial model with governorates headed by governors. However few changes were made and as the language of the administrators was still Swedish the old terminology from during the Swedish time continued in local use. The Vyborg Governorate was not initially part of the Grand Principality, but in 1812 it was transferred from Russia proper to Finland.

Governorates 

After 1831 there were eight provinces in the Grand Principality.

 Åbo och Björneborg Governorate
 Kuopio Governorate
 Vaasa Governorate
 Nyland Governorate
 St. Michel Governorate
 Tavastehus Governorate
 Uleåborg Governorate
 Viborg Governorate

History 

The Vyborg Governorate was established  in territories ceded by the Swedish Empire in the Great Northern War. By the Treaty of Nystad in 1721, Sweden formally ceded control of the parts of the Viborg and Nyslott County and the Kexholm County located on the Karelian Isthmus to Russia. The governorate was extended in 1743 when Sweden ceded control of the rest of Viborg and Nyslott, now called the Kymmenegård and Nyslott County, by the Treaty of Åbo. In the Swedish kingdom the ceded territories was also known as Old Finland, and between 1802 and 1812 it was named the "Finland Governorate".

During the Napoleonic Wars, the Kingdom of Sweden had allied itself with the Russian Empire, United Kingdom and the other parties against Napoleonic France. However, following the treaty of Treaty of Tilsit in 1807, Russia made peace with France. In 1808, and supported by France, Russia successfully challenged the Swedish control over Finland in the Finnish War. In the Treaty of Fredrikshamn on September 17, 1809 Sweden was obliged to cede all its territory in Finland, east of the Torne River, to Russia. The ceded territories became a part of the Russian Empire and was reconstituted into the Grand Duchy of Finland, with the Russian Tsar as Grand Duke. 

In 1812 the Vyborg Governorate was transferred from Russia proper to the Grand Principality. The transfer, announced by Tsar Alexander I just before Christmas, on December 23, 1811 O.S. (January 4, 1812 N.S.), can be seen as a symbolic gesture and an attempt to appease the sentiment of the Finnish population, which had just experienced Russian conquest of their country by force in the Finnish War.

In 1831 the Nyland-Tavastehus Governorate was divided into the Nyland Governorate and the Tavastehus Governorate.

Upon the death of Tsar Nicholas I in 1855, a small group of citizens in the city of Vaasa tendered a petition to change the name of the city after him. The name of the city came from the Royal House of Vasa and despite that only 15 citizens were backing the proposal the name of the city was changed to Nikolaistad. This also meant that the Vasa Governorate was called Николайстадская губерния (Nikolaistadskaya gubérnija) in Russian, after 1855. The official Swedish, and later the Finnish, name for the province did not change. 

After being a part of Sweden for seven centuries, the first half century of Finland as a Russian Grand Principality meant a period of consolidation into the Russian Empire, where the authorities managed to convince the imperial court of the loyalty of the Finnish population and the officials to Russia. This resulted in the re-establishment of the Diet of Finland and an increased autonomy, an example of which was the elevation of Finnish from a language for the common people to a national language equal to Swedish.

The period of liberalisation came to an end in 1899 when a campaign of attempted Russification was initiated, and attempt that ultimately would prove unsuccessful and detrimental for Finland's relationship with Russia. The policy of Russification, coupled with Russian defeat in World War I and the subsequent Russian Revolution paved the way for  Finland's declaration of independence on December 6, 1917. The former Swedish counties, that for a century had been ruled as governorates of a Russian Grand Principality, would now become the provinces of an independent Republic of Finland.

See also
Counties of Sweden
Governorates of the Russian Empire
Baltic governorates
Provinces of Finland

Former provinces of Finland

Grand Duchy of Finland